Jilin Television  (JLTV) is a television network covering the Changchun city and Jilin province area. It was founded and started to broadcast on October 1, 1959. JLTV currently broadcasts in Chinese, Manchu, and Mongol.

Channels 
 Jilin Satellite Television
 City Channel
 Movie Channel
 Rural Channel
 Lifecycle Channel
 Public & News Channel
 Variety & Cultural Channel
 Jilin Jiayou Shopping Channel
 Northeast Opera Channel (pay channel)
 Changying Channel
 Yanbian Satellite Television

Former channels 
 Basketball Channel (pay channel, stopped airing on January 25, 2022)

External links
Official Site 

Television networks in China
Mass media in Changchun
Television channels and stations established in 1959